Vicente Ramos Cecilio (born 18 March 1947) is a Spanish retired professional basketball player. At a height of 1.80 m (5'11") tall, and a weight of 79 kg (175 lbs), he played at the point guard position.

Club career
Ramos was a FIBA European Selection, in 1970.

Spain national team
With the senior Spain men's national basketball team, Ramos played at the 1968 Summer Olympics, and at the 1972 Summer Olympics. He won a silver medal at EuroBasket 1973.

Awards and accomplishments
9× Spanish League Champion: (1969, 1970, 1971, 1972, 1973, 1974, 1975, 1976, 1977)
7× Spanish Cup Winner: (1970, 1971, 1972, 1973, 1974, 1975, 1977)
2× EuroLeague Champion: (1974, 1978)
3× FIBA Intercontinental Cup Champion: (1976, 1977, 1978)

Personal
Ramos is the uncle of tennis player Fernando Verdasco.

References

External links
FIBA Profile 1
FIBA Profile 2
FIBA Europe Profile

1947 births
Living people
People from Ciudad Rodrigo
Sportspeople from the Province of Salamanca
Spanish men's basketball players
1974 FIBA World Championship players
Basketball players at the 1968 Summer Olympics
Basketball players at the 1972 Summer Olympics
Olympic basketball players of Spain
Real Madrid Baloncesto players
Point guards